Australian Coach Awards were established by the Australian Coaching Council in 1990 to promote best practice in coaching and those coaches that stood out amongst their peers.  The awards finished after the Australian Coaching Council became part of the Australian Sports Commission's Sport Education Unit on 1 July 2000.

Individual Coach of the Year

Team Coach of the Year

Young Coach of the Year

Domestic League Coach of the Year

Eunice Gill Coach Education Merit Awards
Award in honour of Eunice Gill who played a major role in coach development including Chairperson of the Australian Coaching Council from 1982 to 1986.

Other Awards
 1999 - Scholarship Coach of the Year - Yvette Yin Luo (Badminton)
 1999 - Award for Services to Coaches - Ron Tindall (WA Coaching Foundation)

See also
Australian Institute of Sport Awards
Australian Sport Awards

References

Australian sports trophies and awards
Coaching awards
Australian sports coaching awards
Awards established in 1990

External links
Australian Coach Awards 1990 - 1997